Whitley is a civil parish in the unitary authority of Cheshire West and Chester and the ceremonial county of Cheshire, England. It is surrounded by the parishes of Antrobus, Comberbach, Little Leigh and Dutton. It also borders Daresbury in Halton borough as well as Hatton and Stretton in Warrington borough. It is a small village located next to Antrobus.

The civil parish was created on 1 April 1936 based on Whitley Inferior and Whitley Superior, now known as Lower Whitley and Higher Whitley.

Whitley lies mostly in the northern part of a triangle of land bounded by the A49 (Warrington to Whitchurch) to the west, the A559 (Warrington to Northwich) to the east and the A533
(Runcorn to Northwich) to the south.

Transport 
Roads

All public roads in the village are maintained by Cheshire West and Chester council. The A49 Tarporley Road is a single carriageway primary road (formerly a trunk road).  Between the world wars the Lower Whitley By-Pass was constructed, the old route being called Street Lane. The A559 Northwich Road has always been a county road and is generally a narrower road. Just half a mile to the north of the parish is the M56 North Cheshire Motorway.

Buses

Buses run through the village from Warrington to Northwich and vice versa.  These are operated by Warrington Borough Transport, although Cheshire West and Chester Council do subsidise the service. In 2006 the services running through Weaverham and Little Leigh were discontinued.  This means no bus services now run along the A49 through Whitley, though they still run on the A559.

Public houses 
Whitley has two public houses,  the Chetwode Arms on Street Lane (the old A49) and the Birch and Bottle on Northwich Road.  Both were owned by Greenall Whitley & Co until it moved away from pubs in the 1990s, as was a third pub, The Millstone on Grimsditch Lane, now closed.

Education 
Whitley Village School is a primary school providing infant and junior education for the children of Whitley and Dutton. Secondary education is currently provided by Weaverham High School.  Previously it was in the catchment area of The County High School Leftwich (formerly Leftwich High School). Previously to this children went to Broomfields High School, now part of Bridgewater High School.

Notable people
Michelle Donelan, Conservative politician
 Colin Crompton, Comedian

See also

 St Luke's Church, Lower Whitley

References

External links
 

Civil parishes in Cheshire
Cheshire West and Chester